Best of Soul is Korean pop singer BoA's second Japanese greatest hits album. This is her first greatest hits album to contain her Japanese songs. The album was released on February 2, 2005, under Avex Trax. The album contains singles from her debut Japanese album, Listen to My Heart to her third album, Love & Honesty. It also contains two singles that were released for the album, "Quincy / Kono Yo no Shirushi" and "Meri Kuri". The album was released in two versions; the regular stranded CD version and a "perfect" version, which was packaged with a DVD that contained a few of her music videos. Best of Soul is BoA's fourth album to attain the number one position and was certified million by the Recording Industry Association of Japan.

Overview
Best of Soul was released nearly one year after her third studio album, Love & Honesty. In order to promote the album BoA released two singles "Quincy / Kono Yo no Shirushi" and "Meri Kuri". The former debuted at #4 on the Oricon single chart while the latter debuted at #5. Upon its release Best of Soul ranked number one of the Oricon album selling 489,067 copies in its first week. The album later sold 1.003.000copies in May 2005 which made BoA the only non-Japanese Asian singer to have two albums that sold over a million copies in Japan. The first album to do so was her second studio album, Valenti which was released two years prior.

By the end of the year Best of Soul sold a total of 1,060,039 copies making it the ninth best-selling album of 2005.

Track listing

Charts and sales

Album charts

Sales and certifications

Singles

References

External links
 Official Website  

BoA albums
2005 compilation albums
2005 video albums
Music video compilation albums
Avex Group compilation albums
Avex Group video albums